SONICblue Incorporated (NASDAQ:SBLU) was a public company based in Santa Clara, California.  The firm was a manufacturer of home audio/video equipment with an estimated revenue of $100M - $250M and approximately 700 employees.

SONICblue first filed for Chapter 11 Bankruptcy in March 2003. 

SONICblue again filed for Chapter 11 Bankruptcy Protection amid controversy regarding conflict of interest and criminal disclosure violations involving fraud upon the court by its lawfirm Pillsbury Winthrop Shaw Pittman.

References 

Companies based in Santa Clara, California